is a former Japanese football player.

Playing career
Hommachi was born in Hyogo Prefecture on July 31, 1968. After graduating from Kokushikan University, he joined Furukawa Electric (later JEF United Ichihara) in 1991. However he did not play at all in any match. In 1994, he moved to the newly promoted Japan Football League club NEC Yamagata (later Montedio Yamagata). He played as a regular player at center back. The club was promoted to the new J2 League in 1999. He retired at the end of the 1999 season.

Club statistics

References

External links

J.League

1968 births
Living people
Kokushikan University alumni
Association football people from Hyōgo Prefecture
Japanese footballers
Japan Soccer League players
J1 League players
J2 League players
Japan Football League (1992–1998) players
JEF United Chiba players
Montedio Yamagata players
Association football defenders